Plymouth is a borough in Luzerne County, Pennsylvania, United States. The population was 5,763 as of the 2020 census.

History

Plymouth was first settled in 1769 by the Susquehanna Company of Connecticut, and until its incorporation as a borough in 1866, was part of Plymouth Township. The Pennamite-Yankee Wars were fought in the surrounding area. The town is situated in the once rich anthracite coal fields of eastern Pennsylvania. Coal was first shipped in 1807. In the past, the products of its manufacturing establishments included miners’ drilling machines and squibs, silk hosiery, and lumber products. Its population peaked in 1910 at 16,996.

Architecture

At the beginning of the 19th century, Plymouth's primary industry was agriculture, and many of its residents were the descendants of the Connecticut Yankees who first settled the town. Its early architecture resembled that of a small New England village.

Large quantities of anthracite coal lay below the surface at various depths, and by the 1850s, coal mining had become the town's primary occupation, attracting a more diverse population. After the arrival of the railroad in 1857, the town's architecture became more typical of a growing industrial center.

Geography

Demographics

2020 demographics
At the 2020 census, Plymouth had a population of 5,763.

2010 demographics

At the 2010 census, Plymouth had a population of 5,951. The reported racial and ethnic origin of the population was 90.6% White, 4.3% African American, 0.2% Native American, 0.5% Asian, 0.1% from other races, 2.0% reporting two or more races, and 3.3% Hispanic or Latino.

2000 demographics
As of the census of 2000, Plymouth had a population of 6,507. The reported racial and ethnic origin of the population was 98.4% White, 0.8% African American, 0.2% Native American, 0.1% Asian, 0.2% from other races, and 0.3% from two or more races. Hispanic or Latino of any race were 0.8% of the population. The median income for a household in the borough was $27,379.

Notable people

Ike Borsavage (1924-2014), born in Plymouth; professional basketball player.
Abe Cohen (1933-2001), born in Plymouth; professional football player.
Stanley Woodward Davenport (1861-1921), born and lived in Plymouth; lawyer and Democratic congressman.
Mark Duda (born 1961), born in Plymouth; professional football player.
Harry Livingston French (1871-1928), born in Plymouth; grew up there; the architect of Plymouth’s Central School.
Gwilym Gwent (1834-1891), Welsh-born composer; lived and worked in Plymouth after immigrating.
Jimmy Harnen (born 1963), grew up in Plymouth; singer and songwriter.
Gov. Arthur Horace James (1883-1973), Plymouth native son; lawyer, judge, governor of Pennsylvania.
Benjamin James (1912-2015), born in Plymouth; college football coach.
Col. Benjamin Washington Johnson (1924-1992), Plymouth high school class of 1933; record-breaking collegiate sprinter.
M.C. Jones (1894-1932), born in Plymouth; race car driver.
Joe Katchik (1931-2014), born in Plymouth; Plymouth high school class of 1949; professional football player.
Walter J. Kozloski (1935-1979), born in Plymouth; New Jersey politician.
David Kautter (born ca 1948), Plymouth high school class of 1966; lawyer and tax policy advisor.
Frank Martz Sr. (1885-1936), born in Plymouth; businessman.
John E. Mazur (1930-2013), born in Plymouth; Plymouth high school class of 1948; professional football player.
John G. Mellus (1917-2005), born in Plymouth; professional football player.
Thomas Byron Miller (1896-1976), born in Plymouth; lawyer, Republican congressman.
George Washington Shonk (1850-1900), born in Plymouth; lawyer and Republican congressman.
Herbert B. Shonk (1881-1930), born in Plymouth; New York politician.
James Francis Stanley (1887-1947), born in Plymouth; professional baseball player.
John Kraynack (1894-1961), born in Plymouth; one of many pugilists who adopted the alias “K.O. Sweeney.”
Thomas W. Templeton (1867-1935), born in Plymouth; florist, Republican congressman.
Frank Comerford Walker (1886-1959), born in Plymouth; lawyer, United States Postmaster General.
Thomas Joseph Walker (1877-1945), born in Plymouth; lawyer, and United States Customs Court judge.
Hendrick Bradley Wright (1808-1881), born in Plymouth; lawyer, Democratic congressman and author; his history of Plymouth was published in 1873.

See also
History of Plymouth, Pennsylvania
Coal mining in Plymouth, Pennsylvania
Architecture of Plymouth, Pennsylvania
Pennamite–Yankee War
Shawnee Cemetery, Plymouth, Pennsylvania

References

External links

Pennsylvania populated places on the Susquehanna River
Populated places established in 1769
Boroughs in Luzerne County, Pennsylvania
Lithuanian-American culture in Pennsylvania
1769 establishments in Pennsylvania